This is a list of ancient Buddhist sites, relics, traditions and places from the Indian state of Kerala. 
Even though Kerala does not have any major presence of Buddhists in modern times, many historians recognize a Buddhist heritage that seem to have existed until the 10th century CE along with a widespread Sramana tradition of co-existence between Vedic Hinduism, Buddhism, Jainism and ancient Dravidian folk religion.

List of statues discovered 

There are about five Buddha statues that were discovered from modern day Kerala. These include:
 Karumadikkuttan, a half-broken Buddha statue found close to the Sri Krishna Temple at Karumady near Ambalapuzha. It was visited by Dalai Lama in 1965 and a pagoda was built to house the statue. It is made from black rock and seated on a pedestal facing west direction. This statue has a height of 3.5 feet and the head also possess markings that resemble a headgear. Local accounts attribute the inflicted damages to either of two different (although unproven) possible causes:
 a charging elephant enraged by the villagers and 
 the forces of a Mughal king who ordered the Buddhist statues to be destroyed across India
 Buddha statue near Sree Krishna Swamy Temple, Buddha Junction, Mavelikkara. It was accidentally excavated during the early 20th century, from a paddy field near the Kandiyoor temple. This statue is four feet high and is perhaps the biggest one found till date in Kerala. The head has engravings that resemble the helmet typically found on Greek warrior statues, whereas the body has markings from a sacred thread and the shoulder is partially draped with a shawl.

 Buddha statue at Bharanikkavu, found near the Bharanikkavu Devi temple located 8 km north-west of Mavelikkara. The statue is placed in a seated position and was elegantly carved. However, similar to the other statues discovered, the hair is not prominently engraved.
 Buddha statue at Pallikkal, about 11 km from Adoor was found headless.
 Buddha statue at Karunagapally, found in a temple tank, this statue is probably the best found till date. Unaware local people used this even to clean their clothes (like an ordinary stone) until 1980, when the Kerala State department of Archaeology acquired it. This statue is currently preserved at Krishnapuram Palace Museum, Kayamkulam.

List of temples discovered 

 Sri Mulavasam, a Buddhist temple and place of pilgrimage in Kerala (either around the Thrikkunnapuzha-Ambalapuzha region or in North Malabar).
 Neelamperoor Palli Bhagavathi Temple, near Kottayam
 Kiliroor Kunnummel Bhagavathy Temple a unique temple at Kiliroor near Kottayam, dedicated to Goddess Karthyayani (Bhagavathy) but containing an actual sculpture of Buddha, within a shrine devoted to Krishna. The Krishna idol resembles a Yogic Avalokitesvara in Padmasana. The Krishna shrine is in Gaja Prishta architectural style (that resembles the bottom of a standing elephant), a style that is commonly found in ancient Buddhist temples. This shrine faces the east and the northern door is designated for Sri Buddha but remains closed. According to the Aithihyamala by Kottarathil Sankunni, the temple is dated 942 CE (117 Malayalam Era).

List of Inscriptions, Copper Plates and Artifacts with Buddhist heritage 
The Paliyam copper plates (or Sreemoolavasam Cheppedukal from Sri Mulavasam) of the Ay King, Vikramaditya Varagunan (885–925 AD) in the fifteenth year of his rule, indicates that Buddhists enjoyed royal patronage and privileges until the 10th century CE, at least in South Kerala.

Quote:
"The plates were discovered by T. A. Gopinatha Rao. According to Elamkulam Kunjan Pillai, the plates date back to AD 929 (Makaram 7, Kollavarsham 104).  But more credibility is to the finding of M. G. S. Narayanan that these date back to AD 898. According to the inscription, a huge number of land holdings were donated to the Sri Mulavasam. The upkeep of the lands are believed to have been vested with Prince Indukotha, an heir to the throne, during the reign of Veerakotha Kulasekhara. A mangalacharana praising Buddha, dharma, and sangha is inscribed in the plates. They also mention about Paranthaka Chola's attack on Kerala."

List of colloquial words of potential Buddhist history 
 Palli, a Malayalam word that refers to the worship places of non-Hindus, i.e. a Church or Mosque or Synagogue. It is believed that originally palli had referred to a Buddhist (or Jain) place of worship in Kerala.

List of current (non-Buddhist) religious sites with potential but unproven Buddhist history 
 Sabarimala, the abode of the celibate Ayyappan also known as Dharma Shastha. Some of the traditions of the Sabarimala pilgrimage bear resemblance to Buddhist traditions, an obvious example being the "Sharanam" chants "Swami Sharanam Ayyappa" similar to the Buddhist chants "Buddham Sharanam Gachami". Some Buddhists even consider Ayyappa as the incarnation of Buddha. In 2018 Government of Kerala submitted before the Kerala High Court that there is a school of thought which believes that Sabarimala was a Buddhist center of worship and word 'Saranam' used to worship the deity derived from Buddhism

 Temples devoted to Bhadrakali or Durga (often simply called Devi or Bhagavathy in Malayalam) and Sree Krishna at former places of Buddhist influence. Several Bhadrakali temples have their main Bharani festival during the month of Kumbham (Feb–March). This devotion to Bhadrakali is most likely a living testament of the importance Buddhism gives to Mahākāla, similar to Hinduism.

List of traditions and practices of potential Buddhist origin 
 Theyyam, a popular ritual form of worship of North Malabar in Kerala (predominantly in the Kolathunadu area) as well as in Southern Karnataka (such as Coorg or South Canara). The word is probably a variant of Dheivam or Theivam that means God in Malayalam and Tamil.
 Pallipana, a ritual performed by velans (sorcerers) every 12 years during the Arattu festival at Ambalappuzha Sri Krishna Temple
 Pooram Padayani, a festival at Neelamperoor Palli Bhagavathi Temple in praise of Goddess Vanadurga, which is considered similar to the Buddhist festival seen by Fahian at Patna, Bihar. The main feature is the display of exquisitely decorated effigies named Kettukazhcha. Padayani is a symbolic victory march of Goddess Kali after vanquishing Darika.
 Kettukazhcha at Chettikulangara Devi Temple, where the main deity is Goddess Bhadrakali.

 Kodungallur Bharani festival in honour of the deity Kodungallur Bhagavathy (Bhadrakali) who is considered the legendary Kannagi of Tamil mythology and who is also revered as Goddess Pattini by Sri Lankan Sinhalese Buddhists.
 Valiyakulangara Kettukazhcha at Valiyakulangara Devi Temple
 Thalappoli festival at Kodungallur Bhagavathy Temple

List of places (villages and towns) with ancient Buddhist presence 
 Alappuzha-Ambalappuzha region that was under Buddhist influence during the rule of the Ay King Varaguna.
 Onattukara
 Mavelikkara
 Karunagapally
 Karthikapally
 Pallikkal, Adoor
 Pallickal, Nooranad 
 Pallickal, Mavelikkara
 Pallickal, Kollam
 Pallickal, Thiruvananthapuram
 Pallikal Kavu, Kothamangalam
 Pallippuram, several places with this name
 Puthuppally, several places with this name
 Vazhappally, Changanassery
 Mundappally
 Mundiappally, near Thiruvalla
 Vazhappully, near Thrissur
 Dharmadom, a small town near Thalassery, was a Buddhist stronghold known as Dharmapattanam in the ancient days. Andaloor, a place within Dharmadom village, is famous for its ancient Theyyam artform as well as the Andaloor Kavu (sacred grove).

Modern Buddhist sites 
 Kakkayur Buddha temple, at Kakkayur village near Chittur town, Palakkad district. It was built below a Bodhi (Pipal) tree planted at around 1949–1950 CE, as a seed that a local farmer collected from the Bodhi tree of Bodh Gaya.
Vezhanganam Buddha temple and study center near Pala, Kottayam by Tibetan Buddhist monks of Bylakuppe.
Buddha Vihar near Kozhikode Beach started by Mithavaadi Krishnan this center had strong connection with Buddhism in Sri Lanka

See also 
 Buddhist pilgrimage sites in India
 Buddhism amongst Tamils
 Buddhism in Sri Lanka
 Naga Nadu and Naga people of Sri Lanka
 Palli Bana Perumal
 Mahakali Caves, ancient Buddhist viharas near Mumbai with a Bhadrakali temple nearby.
 Perambalur Buddhas, a set of historic Buddhist images found in Thiyaganur, Perambalur district where the only surviving Buddhist temple of Tamil Nadu is located.

References

External links 

 Buddha Temple & Buddha Statues, Thiyaganur, Salem
 :ml:ബുദ്ധമതം കേരളത്തിൽ
 :ml:കേരളത്തിലെ ബുദ്ധപ്രതിമകൾ

Buddhism in Kerala
Kerala-related lists
Buddhism-related lists